is a private university in Ube, Yamaguchi, Japan. After being established as a junior college in 1960, the school became a four-year college in 2002.

Faculty 
 Faculty of Psychology
 Department of Psychology
 Faculty of Human Health
 Department of Nursing

External links
 Official website 

Educational institutions established in 1960
Private universities and colleges in Japan
Universities and colleges in Yamaguchi Prefecture
1960 establishments in Japan